

Incumbents  
 President - Árpád Göncz
 Prime Minister - Viktor Orbán

Events

March 
March 12 - Hungary joins NATO.

September
September 30 - The 50 Fillér coin is removed from circulation

November
November 30 - The Hortobágy National Park becomes a World Heritage Site

Deaths

January

 6 January – Lajos Tichy, 63, Hungarian footballer.
 22 January – Gabor Carelli, 83, Hungarian classical tenor.

February

 1 February – Rudolf Kárpáti, 78, Hungarian fencer and Olympic champion.
 2 February – Vilmos Tátrai, 86, Hungarian classical violinist .
 15 February – [[[Ferenc Vozar]], 53, Hungarian ice hockey player and Olympic medalist.

March

 6 March –
 Ferenc Kardos, 61, Hungarian film director, producer and screenwriter, heart attack.
 János Parti, 66, Hungarian sprint canoeist and Olympic champion.

See also
 List of Hungarian films since 1990

References

 
1990s in Hungary
Hungary
Hungary